Kristofer Sjursson Hjeltnes (1730–April 1804) was a Norwegian farmer and businessperson.  

Hjeltnes was born in the parish of Ulvik  in Hordaland, Norway.   He was the son of Sjur Gunnarsson Ringøy (1689-1754) and Anna Christopherdotter Øydvin (1697-1761). As the sole surviving heir, he inherited the estate of his parents which included several forested farms as well as use of church property in the  parish. He tried  experimenting with the cultivation of various plant species including  tobacco, caraway, clove and most importantly the potato. His successful experimentation  with the potato in 1759 is commonly credited with first introducing its cultivation into the district of Hardanger.  This was at a time in which the potato was first being successfully cultivated at various sites throughout the country. 

He founded one of the first plant nurseries in the district and also established storehouses for grain. Besides farming, he was also involved in reindeer herding and ran a sawmill and a timber merchant company.

Personal life
He married Marta Sjursdatter Vestrheim (1728-1805) in 1751. They had eight children. They were the great-grandparents of Kristofer Frimann Kristofersson Hjeltnes, a horticulturist who operated the Hjeltnes Horticulture School (Hjeltnes hagebruksskule) in Ulvik.

References

External links
How The Potato Was Brought To Norway

1730 births
1804 deaths
Norwegian farmers
People from Ulvik
18th-century Norwegian businesspeople